Hermann Kugelstadt (1912–2001) was a German screenwriter and film director. In the 1950s he directed a number of productions in the popular heimatfilm tradition. During the 1960s he switched to television work.

Selected filmography

Director
 Heimat Bells (1952)
 The Mill in the Black Forest (1953)
 The Hunter's Cross (1954)
 The Dark Star (1955)
 The Forest House in Tyrol (1955)
 Two Bavarians in St. Pauli (1956)
 The Hunter from Roteck (1956)
 Between Munich and St. Pauli (1957)
 War of the Maidens (1957)
 Candidates for Marriage (1958)
 Hello Taxi (1958)
 The Street (1958)
 Hunting Party (1959)
 Die Karte mit dem Luchskopf (1963–1965, TV series)
 Sir Roger Casement (1968, TV film)
  (1969, TV film)
 Friedrich Ebert und Gustav Stresemann, Schicksalsjahre der Republik (1969, TV film)
  (1969, TV film)
 Junger Herr auf altem Hof (1969–1970, TV series)
 Der Fall Sorge (1970, TV film)
 Die Halsbandaffäre (1971, TV film)
 Hallo – Hotel Sacher … Portier! (1973–1974, TV series)

Assistant Director
 A Hopeless Case (1939)
 Hotel Sacher (1939)
 Renate in the Quartet (1939)
 Nanette (1940)
 Incognito in Paradise (1950)

References

Bibliography
Robert von Dassanowsky. Austrian Cinema: A History. McFarland, 2005.

External links

1912 births
2001 deaths
Mass media people from Hesse
People from Limburg an der Lahn